Okezie  is both an Igbo surname and given name. Notable people with the name include:

Okezie Ikpeazu (born 1964), Nigerian politician
Chidi Okezie (born 1993), American sprinter
Joe Okezie (born 1937), Nigerian boxer

Igbo-language surnames
Igbo given names